The 1963 Wake Forest Demon Deacons football team was an American football team that represented Wake Forest University during the 1963 NCAA University Division football season. In its fourth season under head coach Bill Hildebrand, the team compiled a 1–9 record and finished in seventh place in the Atlantic Coast Conference (ACC).

Schedule

Team leaders

References

Wake Forest
Wake Forest Demon Deacons football seasons
Wake Forest Demon Deacons football